Jane Harvey (born Phyllis Taff, January 6, 1925 – August 15, 2013) was an American jazz singer, known for recording several tracks with famous musicians such as Duke Ellington and Benny Goodman during the 1940s.

Phyllis Taft was born on January 6, 1925, in Jersey City, New Jersey. She auditioned for Barney Josephson, who offered her an opportunity to perform at his Greenwich Village's nightclub, Café Society. Prior to performing, Taft changed her name to Jane Harvey.

In 1946, she joined Desi Arnaz's Orchestra, until she left in 1958 to raise her son, Bob Thiele Jr. She also entertained at military bases overseas with Bob Hope. During the late 1950s, she joined Duke Ellington's Orchestra. Around the time of her death, she performed locally, all over the Los Angeles area.

She was married to record producer Bob Thiele and had two children, her son Robert and a daughter. She later married William King.

Harvey died of cancer at her home in Los Angeles on August 15, 2013.

References

External links
 
 Martin Chilton, "Marian McPartland and Jane Harvey: Jazz pioneers - Jazz world mourns the loss of two trailblazing women stars", The Telegraph, August 22, 2013.

American jazz singers
1925 births
2013 deaths
Musicians from Jersey City, New Jersey
Deaths from cancer